Dream Hog EP is an EP released by the band The Suburbs. Initially released by Twin/Tone Records, it was later reissued on the Mercury label, making it the band's first major label release.

Track listing

12" (TTR 8230)
"Roll Over City"
"Waiting"
"Yo Sa Ba I I Noni"
"The Best Is Over"
"Waiting (Club Mix)"

Personnel
 Chan Poling - keyboards, vocals
 Beej Chaney - beejtar, vocals
 Hugo Klaers - drums
 Bruce C. Allen - guitar, vocals
 Michael Halliday - bass

References

External links
  The album page on the Twin/Tone website.

1982 EPs
The Suburbs albums
Twin/Tone Records EPs